Mount Chandler is a mountain  northwest of Mount Caywood in the Behrendt Mountains, Palmer Land. It was mapped by the United States Geological Survey from surveys and from U.S. Navy air photos, 1961–67, and named by the Advisory Committee on Antarctic Names for Lieutenant Commander J.L. Chandler, U.S. Navy, pilot of R4D aircraft in support of the Antarctic Peninsula Traverse party to this area, 1961–62.

References 

Mountains of Palmer Land